Che Bunce (born 29 August 1975 in Auckland) is a New Zealand footballer was a player-coach for Waikato FC in the NZFC. He is a lawyer by trade.

Club career
In April 2006 he signed for New Zealand Knights where he was captain for the A-League 2006-07 season.

Bunce was on trial at Scottish Premier League side Dundee United in late January 2007, and despite being expected to join the Terrors, joined Coventry City instead. Bunce failed to make an appearance for City and was told in April 2007 that he was free to leave the Ricoh Arena at the end of the season.

International career
Bunce played for the New Zealand U-23 and made 29 appearances for the New Zealand national football team, the All Whites from 1998, scoring 2 goals.,

His last appearance was on 24 March 2007 when the All Whites endured an embarrassing 4–0 loss to Costa Rica.

References

External links
 Che Bunce Interview
 No kidding, Bunce still has it
 Kiwi finds a niche in Iceland league

 

1975 births
Living people
Association footballers from Auckland
New Zealand association footballers
New Zealand international footballers
Navua F.C. players
A-League Men players
National Soccer League (Australia) players
Drogheda United F.C. players
League of Ireland players
Che Bunce
Coventry City F.C. players
Football Kingz F.C. players
New Zealand Knights FC players
Randers FC players
Sheffield United F.C. players
Hawke's Bay United FC players
Waikato FC players
Napier City Rovers FC players
Crewe Alexandra F.C. players
1998 OFC Nations Cup players
1999 FIFA Confederations Cup players
2000 OFC Nations Cup players
2004 OFC Nations Cup players
New Zealand expatriate association footballers
Expatriate footballers in Iceland
Expatriate men's footballers in Denmark
Expatriate footballers in Fiji
New Zealand expatriate sportspeople in Iceland
New Zealand expatriate sportspeople in Denmark
New Zealand expatriate sportspeople in Fiji
Association football central defenders